Shirin Bolagh (also Romanized as Shīrīn Bolāgh; also known as Shīrīn Bulāgh) is a village in Rudshur Rural District, in the Central District of Zarandieh County, Markazi Province, Iran. At the 2006 census, its population was 18, in 4 families.

References 

Populated places in Zarandieh County